Apatrapa is a town in the Kwadaso Municipality near Kumasi in Ashanti region of Ghana.

Institution 
The Apatrapa Health Center has an over 41-bed capacity ward. It is located in the town which was commissioned by the Kwadaso Municipal Assembly.

References 

Communities in Ghana
Ashanti Region